During the 1993–94 English football season, Crystal Palace F.C. competed in the Football League First Division.

Season summary
Smith immediately guided Palace back to the Premier League as runaway champions of the second tier, Chris Armstrong top-scoring with 22 league goals. During this period the badge was changed with the bird being replaced by one which Ron Noades felt more closely resembled an eagle.

Final league table

Results
Crystal Palace's score comes first

Legend

Football League First Division

FA Cup

League Cup

Anglo-Italian Cup

Players

First-team squad
Squad at end of season

References

Notes

Crystal Palace F.C. seasons
Crystal Palace